The Libera Award for Video of the Year is an award presented by the American Association of Independent Music at the annual Libera Award which recognizes "most impactful or visually compelling short-form music video" since 2012.

Winners and nominees

Multiple nominations and awards

References

External links

Video of the Year